Chandra Fernando may refer to:

Chandra Fernando (police officer), police officer
Chandra Fernando (priest), priest